Yargil is a rural locality (a selo) in Ashaga-Yaraksky Selsoviet, Khivsky District, Republic of Dagestan, Russia. The population was 39 as of 2010.

Geography 
Yargil is located 13 km northeast of Khiv (the district's administrative centre) by road. Kug is the nearest rural locality.

References 

Rural localities in Khivsky District